Metaxmeste nubicola is a moth in the family Crambidae. It was described by Eugene G. Munroe in 1954. It is found in North America, where it has been recorded from Colorado and Washington. The habitat consists of arctic-alpine areas.

References

Moths described in 1954
Odontiini